Paltso is a rural locality (a settlement) in Bryansky District, Bryansk Oblast, Russia. The population was 880 as of 2018. There are 21 streets.

Geography 
Paltso is located 90 km east of Glinishchevo (the district's administrative centre) by road. Khotomirichi is the nearest rural locality.

References 

Rural localities in Bryansky District